Enkeleid Dobi (born 23 May 1975) is an Albanian football manager and a former player. He played for clubs in Albania, Croatia, Slovenia, Poland and France as well as the Albania national team.

Club career
Dobi played as forward for NK Varteks in the Croatian First League. He played for Zagłębie Lubin and Górnik Zabrze in the Polish Ekstraklasa during 2004.

International career
He scored the second goal in his country's 2-0 victory against Bosnia and Herzegovina in November 1995, in what was Bosnia's first official match as an independent nation after affiliating with FIFA. It was also his debut for Albania and he earned a total of 6 caps, scoring 1 goal. His final international was a February 2003 friendly match against Vietnam.

National team statistics

Coaching career
On 30 July 2020 he signed a one-year contract with Polish I liga club Widzew Łódź. On 13 April 2021 he was dismissed.

References

External links
 

1975 births
Living people
Footballers from Durrës
Albanian footballers
Association football forwards
Albania international footballers
KF Teuta Durrës players
NK Varaždin players
NK Beltinci players
Zagłębie Lubin players
Górnik Zabrze players
ES Viry-Châtillon players
Sainte-Geneviève Sports players
Miedź Legnica players
Albanian expatriate footballers
Expatriate footballers in Croatia
Expatriate footballers in Slovenia
Expatriate footballers in Poland
Expatriate footballers in France
Albanian expatriate sportspeople in Croatia
Albanian expatriate sportspeople in Slovenia
Albanian expatriate sportspeople in Poland
Albanian expatriate sportspeople in France
Kategoria Superiore players
Albanian football managers
Widzew Łódź managers
Albanian expatriate football managers
Expatriate football managers in Poland